This is a list of songs written or co-written by Hyuna, a South Korean singer-songwriter.

Songwriting and Composing credits

 
Hyuna